Stani bogat (shortened to ) is a Bulgarian game show based on the original British format of Who Wants to Be a Millionaire?. The show is hosted by Mihail Bilalov, previously by Niki Kanchev. The top winning prize is 100,000 Bulgarian lev and may be reached by answering 15 questions correctly. There are three "lifelines," which offer help to the player during the game. They are 50/50, phone a friend, and ask the audience. As of 2022, no person has won 100,000 leva (although Asen Angelov won, he was stripped of his prize). There is one milestone at 500 leva and a floating one, a change for the show's 20th anniversary.

Money Tree

References 

Game shows
Television in Bulgaria
Who Wants to Be a Millionaire?
2001 television series debuts
Nova (Bulgarian TV channel) original programming

2001 Bulgarian television series debuts